Teretriphora is a genus of very small sea snails, marine gastropod mollusks in the family Triphoridae.

Species
Species within the genus Teretriphora include:
 Teretriphora distorta (Laseron, 1958)
 Teretriphora gemmegens (Verco, 1909)
 Teretriphora huttoni Suter, 1908
 Teretriphora novapostrema (Verco, 1910)
 Teretriphora ponderorum Marshall, 1983
 Teretriphora spica (Verco, J.C., 1909)
Species brought into synonymy
 Teretriphora kesteveni (Hedley, 1902): synonym of Latitriphora kesteveni (Hedley, 1903)

References

 Powell A. W. B., New Zealand Mollusca, William Collins Publishers Ltd, Auckland, New Zealand 1979 
 Obis

Triphoridae
Taxa named by Harold John Finlay